Klay may refer to:

Places
 Klay, Liberia
 Klay District, one of four districts of Bomi County, Liberia

People

People with the given name
 Klay Hall, American animation director
 George Klay Kieh (born 1956), Liberian politician
 Klay Shroedel (born 1966), German–American musician, music producer and film producer
 Klay Thompson (born 1990), American NBA basketball player
 Nathaniel Klay Naplah (born 1974), Liberian football coach and former footballer

People with the surname
 Nina Kläy (born 1989), Swiss taekwondo practitioner
 Phil Klay, American author
 Robbie Klay (born 1986), South African singer, songwriter, television and theatre stage actor
 Thomas Kläy (born 1961), Swiss curler

Others
KLAY, AM radio station near Tacoma

See also
 Klaybourne Cheshire, a character in the TV series Chaotic
 Clay (disambiguation)